William Hill Wells (January 7, 1769 – March 11, 1829) was a lawyer and politician from Dagsboro, in Sussex County, Delaware. He was a member of the Federalist Party, who served in the Delaware General Assembly and as U.S. Senator from Delaware.

Early life and family
Wells was born in Burlington, New Jersey. His family came to Sussex County when he was young, and his father began a successful mercantile business at Dagsboro, which the younger Wells continued. He was the son of Rachel (Hill) and Richard Welles (1734–1801), who was born in Kingston upon Hull in England. His marriage to Elizabeth Dagworthy Aydelott, the ward of Revolutionary War General John Dagworthy, greatly increased his wealth, as she had inherited large tracts of Sussex County timberlands. Meanwhile he studied the law, was admitted to the Delaware Bar in 1791, and practiced at Georgetown, Delaware, eventually expanding his practice to Dover, Delaware.

Actor, playwright and director Orson Welles was a great-great-grandson of Wells.

Professional and political career
Wells represented Sussex County for several years in the Delaware General Assembly, initially serving in the State House from the 1795 session through the 1799 session. He was then elected as a Federalist to the United States Senate to fill the vacancy caused by the death of Joshua Clayton and served from January 17, 1799 until November 6, 1804. During this time he joined his Federalist colleagues in opposition to the Louisiana Purchase. He resigned before the completion of his term to seek his fortune in the oil business in northern Pennsylvania. He returned to the State House for the 1811 and 1812 sessions, and spent the 1813 session in the State Senate.  He was again elected as a Federalist to the United States Senate to fill the vacancy caused by the resignation of James A. Bayard, and served from May 28, 1813, to March 3, 1817.  Finally, he served once more in the 1819 session of the State House.

All the while he continued the practice of law in Dagsboro and Millsboro, Delaware, and became heavily involved in the oil business in Pennsylvania.

Death and legacy
Wells died near Dagsboro, Delaware, and is buried in the Prince George's Churchyard, near Dagsboro.

Almanac
Elections were held the first Tuesday of October. Members of the Delaware General Assembly took office on the first Tuesday of January, with the State Senate serving a three-year term, and the State House a one-year term. The General Assembly chose the U.S. Senators, who took office March 4 for a six-year term. In this case he was initially completing the existing term, the vacancy caused by the death of Joshua Clayton, and later completing the existing term the vacancy caused by the resignation of James A. Bayard.

Notes

References

External links
Biographical Directory of the United States Congress 
Delaware's Members of Congress

The Political Graveyard

Places with more information
Delaware Historical Society; website ; 505 Market St, Wilmington, Delaware; (302) 655-7161
University of Delaware; Library website; 181 South College Ave, Newark, Delaware; (302) 831–2965

1769 births
1829 deaths
People from Burlington, New Jersey
American people of English descent
Delaware Federalists
United States senators from Delaware
Federalist Party United States senators
Members of the Delaware House of Representatives
Delaware state senators
People from Georgetown, Delaware
Delaware lawyers
Burials in Sussex County, Delaware
People of colonial New Jersey
19th-century American lawyers